RV Bay Hydro II (S5401), sometimes rendered as R/V Bay Hydro II, is an American oceanographic research vessel in non-commissioned service in the fleet of the National Oceanic and Atmospheric Administration (NOAA) since 2009. She is registered as NOAA S5401.

Design  
Bay Hydro II is a hydrofoil-assisted catamaran. At  in length (sources disagree), she is one of the smallest research vessels in the NOAA fleet.

Bay Hydro II has a  moon pool in her main deck amidships through which she can deploy a sonar on a retractable strut.  She also has two hull-mounted Airmar M42 dual-frequency transducers and an Interocean survey winch for use in towing side-scan sonar equipment.

Construction  
Bay Hydro II was ordered in early 2008 from Kvichak Marine Industries in Seattle, Washington. and completed in September 2008. After her delivery to NOAA, her christening ceremony took place on 15 April 2009 at the Inner Harbor in Baltimore, Maryland. During the ceremony, she received a cannon salute from the sloop-of-war , a museum ship moored in the Inner Harbor.

Operations and service history 

Bay Hydro II is based at the NOAA facility at Solomons, Maryland. She conducts hydrographic survey and environmental protection research operations in the Chesapeake Bay. Upon her christening in April 2009, NOAA noted that her surveying capabilities were the state of the art at the time, and gave NOAA a capability to gather data to create highly accurate nautical charts, including data well on changes in dredged channels, and to respond rapidly to requirements to collect information on new hazards to navigation created by hurricanes, ice, and shipwrecks. Her activities in the Chesapeake Bay support safe navigation to a number of large ports, including Baltimore, Maryland; Wilmington, Delaware; Philadelphia, Pennsylvania; and ports in the Hampton Roads area of Virginia.

NOAA also uses Bay Hydro II to evaluate new hydrographic survey techniques and for outreach to elementary schools, secondary schools, and universities.

See also
 NOAA ships and aircraft

References

External links 
Video "Bay Hydro II dedication" on YouTube

Ships of the National Oceanic and Atmospheric Administration
Ships built in Seattle
2008 ships